Candice Olson (born October 27, 1964) is a Canadian designer. She was the host of the Toronto-based home-makeover shows Divine Design and Candice Tells All, which aired on the W Network in Canada and on HGTV in the United States.

Early life
Olson attended the University of Calgary and played for the Canadian National Women's Volleyball Team at the same time. She then transferred and graduated from  the School of Interior Design at Ryerson University in Toronto.

Olson honed her skills for several years in several of Canada's top interior design firms.

Career

Candice Olson Design
In 1994, she established her own residential and commercial design practice, Candice Olson Design, based in Metro Toronto, Ontario, Canada.

Television
In the fall of 2001, Divine Design debuted on Canada's W Network and quickly established itself as one of the network's flagship shows. Two years later, in 2003, the series premiered on HGTV in the United States in more than 90 million homes.

On January 1, 2011, Olson's new series, Candice Tells All, premiered on HGTV. It debuted on the W Network in Canada on January 6, 2011.

Collection
The Candice Olson Collection is made up of products in the home décor market.  The lines include an upholstered furniture line for Norwalk (MyCandiceDesign.com), The Furniture Idea; a line of fabric from Kravet Inc.; a lighting line; a line of rugs for Surya (surya.com); bettertrends a line of broad case good, occasional, and table line with Revco International; and a wallpaper line for York Wallcoverings (http://www.yorkwallcoverings.com)

Books
In 2006, Olson wrote her first book; Candice Olson on Design: Inspiration and Ideas for Your Home in which she shares design secrets, smart tips, and practical advice to help readers plan and execute successful room makeovers.

Her second book, Candice Olson: Kitchen & Bathrooms was published on March 22, 2011.

Personal life
Olson is married to a builder Jurij Sennecke. They have two children, Pyper and Beckett.  Both of her pregnancies were discussed on various episodes of Divine Design during the second and fourth seasons.

References

External links
 Bio at HGTV
 W Network Website
 Top Interior Designers in Canada

Living people
Canadian interior designers
1964 births
Canadian television hosts
University of Calgary alumni
Toronto Metropolitan University alumni
Canadian women's volleyball players
Canadian women television personalities
Canadian women television hosts